Kibondo District is one of the six districts of Kigoma Region, Tanzania. It is bordered to the north by the Kakonko District, to the east by the Tabora Region, to the south by the Uvinza District, to the west by the Kasulu District and to the northwest by Burundi.

The population of Kibondo District in 2016 was 287,652, from 261,331 in 2012.

Administrative Divisions 

Kibondo District us administratively divided 3 divisions, 19 wards, 50 villages, and 420 hamlets. The three divisions are Kibondo, Muhambwe (also known as Mabamba), and Kifura.

Wards 
The 19 Wards of Kibondo District.

 Bitare
 Biturana
 Busagara
 Bunyambo
 Busunzu
 Itaba
 Kagezi
 Kibondo Mjini
 Kitahana
 Kizazi
 Kumsenga
 Kumwambu
 Mabamba
 Misezero
 Mukabuye
 Murungu
 Nyaruyoba
 Rugongwe
 Rusohoko

Further reading

 Buzard, Nan. Information-Sharing and Coordination Among NGOs Working in the Refugee Camps of Ngara and Kibondo, Tanzania, 1994-1998. Cambridge, Massachusetts: Massachusetts Institute of Technology, Center for International Studies, 2000. 
 Kavura, R. M. The Problem of Developmental Leadership in Kibondo (Kigoma Region). Dar es Salaam: University College, 1970. 
 Morof, Diane F, et al. 2007. Refugee Family Planning: User Profiles from Mtendeli Refugee Camp in Kibondo, Tanzania. Contraception. 76, no. 2: 175. 
 Office of the United Nations High Commissioner for Refugees, and World Food Programme. Kibondo Refugee Camps. Geneva, Switzerland: Unhcr, 2003. 
 Shirika la Chakula Bora Tanzania. Nutrition Situation in Kakonko and Kasanda Divisions, Kibondo District: Baseline Survey Report. Dar es Salaam: Tanzania Food and Nutrition Centre, 1999.

References

 
Districts of Kigoma Region